Cyril "C." Eugene Cox was a Bermudian politician. He served as a Bermuda Progressive Labour Party (PLP) MP from Sandys North, as Minister of Finance, and as Deputy Premier. He was the father of Paula Cox, Jeremy Cox, and Robert Cox. Cox first won a seat in Parliament between 1976 and 1980 in Sandys North. Cox was elected Deputy Leader in 1996, and Minister of Finance on 10 November 1998.

Around New Years' 2004, Cox died at the age of 75 from complications with cancer. His position of Minister of Finance was succeeded by his daughter Paula on 22 January 2004.

References 

Deputy Premiers of Bermuda
Bermudian politicians
2004 deaths